Caroline Gomes dos Santos (born February 6, 1996) is a Brazilian taekwondo athlete. She won a silver medal at the 2019 World Taekwondo Championships on the women's lightweights.

References 

Living people
1996 births
Brazilian female taekwondo practitioners
World Taekwondo Championships medalists
21st-century Brazilian women